Miguel Ângelo Karim Simões Fazenda (born 13 October 1980), known as Tininho, is a Portuguese retired professional footballer who played as a left back.

Football career

Early career
Born in Beira, Mozambique, Tininho spent his first five years as a senior playing in the lower leagues of Portugal (third or fourth tiers). In summer 2004 he signed with S.C. Beira-Mar of the Primeira Liga, suffering relegation in his first season but achieving promotion in his second, as champions.

In the 2006–07 campaign, Tininho appeared in every single league match and totalled 2,544 minutes of play, but the Aveiro side were immediately relegated back to the Segunda Liga.

England
In late July 2007, Tininho signed for English club West Bromwich Albion on a two-year deal worth £230,000, after a successful trial. He made his competitive debut on 11 August in a 1–2 defeat at Burnley, on the opening day of the season. However, he did not play another league game for Albion and, in January 2008 was loaned to fellow Championship side Barnsley for a month, in order to "acclimatise to this league".

On 11 August 2008, Tininho was released from his WBA contract with a view to him returning to Portugal, with Leixões SC. However, nothing came of it, and he eventually joined C.F. Os Belenenses also in the top division in mid-December; the Lisbon team eventually finished second from bottom, being later reinstated after C.F. Estrela da Amadora's demotion due to financial irregularities.

Later years
On 23 July 2009, Tininho signed for FC Steaua București from Romania on a free transfer, agreeing on a one-year contract with an option for a further two seasons. He only played one competitive match during his tenure, against St Patrick's Athletic for the season's UEFA Europa League (four minutes in a 3–0 home win for the last playoff round), being mostly associated with the reserves in the Liga II.

On 6 October 2009, Tininho terminated his contract with Steaua. After several months without a club, he finally joined Leixões for 2010–11's second level.

References

External links

1980 births
Living people
People from Beira, Mozambique
Portuguese footballers
Mozambican footballers
Association football defenders
Primeira Liga players
Liga Portugal 2 players
Segunda Divisão players
S.C.U. Torreense players
CU Micaelense players
S.C. Beira-Mar players
C.F. Os Belenenses players
Leixões S.C. players
Portimonense S.C. players
Atlético Clube de Portugal players
C.D. Pinhalnovense players
English Football League players
West Bromwich Albion F.C. players
Barnsley F.C. players
Liga II players
FC Steaua București players
FC Steaua II București players
Portuguese expatriate footballers
Mozambican expatriate footballers
Expatriate footballers in England
Expatriate footballers in Romania
Portuguese expatriate sportspeople in Romania
Mozambican emigrants to Portugal